The Daniel Stein House in Farmerville, Louisiana was built in about 1875.  It was listed on the National Register of Historic Places in 1988.

It has also been known as Baughman House.  It is one of few surviving houses in Union Parish, Louisiana to represent pre-Queen Anne style.

References

Houses on the National Register of Historic Places in Louisiana
Gothic Revival architecture in Louisiana
Italianate architecture in Louisiana
Houses completed in 1875
Union Parish, Louisiana